The Vollmer House is a historic house built between 1876 to 1885, and located in Lower Pacific Heights area in San Francisco, California. The house is known for its outstanding decorative details on the exterior.

It was listed as a California Historical Landmark since March 8, 1973; and on the National Register of Historic Places as "Building at 1735–1737 Webster Street" on March 8, 1973.

History 
The Vollmer House was built between 1876 to 1885, at 773 Turk Street near Franklin Street in San Francisco. The exact date of the house is unknown and it is possible it was as early as 1876, as the San Francisco Water Department records show this building was connected to the water system that year. The house was designed by the Newsom Brothers (Samuel Newsom and Joseph Newsom) in a Stick/Eastlake-style, and was built for F. Vollerni. The second owner was German-born John J. Vollmer and his family, which had previously lived up the block. Vollmer ran a corner grocery store at Turk Street and Franklin Street. The house escaped damages during the 1906 San Francisco earthquake and fires.

The San Francisco Redevelopment Agency purchased the property in 1967; and by 1974 they relocated the property from Western Addition (due to re-zoning) to its current address at 1735-1737 Webster Street, between Sutter and Bush Streets.

See also 
 National Register of Historic Places listings in San Francisco
 California Historical Landmarks in San Francisco

References

		

Houses in San Francisco
Buildings and structures completed in 1876
Western Addition, San Francisco
History of San Francisco
Stick-Eastlake architecture in California
Houses completed in 1876
Houses on the National Register of Historic Places in San Francisco
California Historical Landmarks